Hypericum australe is a species of plant in the family Hypericaceae. Individuals can grow to 24 cm tall.

Sources

References 

australe
Flora of Malta